Attila is a studio album by Italian singer Mina, released on October 1979 by PDU.

Overview
Released as a double album in the October of 1979, Attila was an immediate success and is one of the top 3 best-selling albums of the singer's career. 
At just sixteen years old, Mina's son Massimiliano Pani made his debut as a songwriter with two tracks entitled: "Sensazioni"  and "Il vento".

Anche un uomo was the ending theme of the TV quiz show Lascia o raddoppia? written by Mike Bongiorno, Anselmo Genovese and the famous "Mr. No" Ludovico Peregrini.

"Don't Take Your Love Away" is a cover of a song written by Isaac Hayes. The song is also the longest track recorded by Mina.

The track "Un po' di più" was originally sung by Patty Pravo and included on her album Sì... incoerenza in 1972.

The song "Rock and Roll Star" and "Anche tu" were also recorded by Mina is Spanish under the titles "Estrella del rock" e "También tù", respectively. These two songs were included on the Spanish version of Attila.

The album cover is signed by Luciano Tallarini, on photographs of Mauro Ballets reworked with the airbrush by Gianni Ronco. The album cover won the prize for best cover of the year and is displayed at the Museum of Modern Art in New York.

Critical reception
Claudio Milano from  noted that Attila was positioned as an ambitious project, but in the end it turned out to be weak. It was from this album, in his opinion, that the decline in Mina's creative path began. Milano called the songs "Don't take Your Love" and "Shadow of My Old Road" the most worthy on the album.

Track listing

Volume 1

Volume 2

Personnel
 Mina – vocals (all tracks)
 Beppe Cantarelli – arrangement (A1, A3, A4, B3, B5, C4, D1), vocals (C4)
 Giulio Libano – arrangement (A2)
 Rudy Brass – arrangement (B1, D5	)
 Shel Shapiro – arrangement (B2, B4, C1, C2)
 Mike Logan – arrangement (C3)
 Erich Bulling – arrangement (D2)
 Teddy Randazzo – arrangement (D2)
 Massimo Salerno – conducting (D2)
 Celso Valli – arrangement (D4)

Charts

References

External links
 

Mina (Italian singer) albums
1979 albums